A list of films produced by the Marathi language film industry based in Maharashtra in the year 1993.

1993 Releases
A list of Marathi films released in 1993.

References

Lists of 1993 films by country or language
 Marathi
1993